Eugène Nicolle (born 16 April 1890, date of death unknown) was a French racing cyclist. He rode in the 1922 Tour de France.

References

External links
 

1890 births
Year of death missing
French male cyclists
Place of birth missing